Tiaret (Berber: Tahert or Tihert, i.e. "Lioness") is a major city in northwestern Algeria that gives its name to the wider farming region of Tiaret Province. It is served by Abdelhafid Boussouf Bou Chekif Airport.

Etymology
The name means "Lioness" in the Berber language, a reference to the Barbary lions that lived in this region. Maghrebian place names like Oran (Uhran) which means "lion", and Souk Ahras which means "Market of Lions" have the same etymological source.

Population
The town had a population of 178,915 in 2008. The town covered around 20.086.62 km²

Infrastructure & industry
A 1992 study by the University of Nice Sophia Antipolis reported significant areas contaminated by industrial pollution, and growing squatter settlements on the periphery.

The region is predominantly one of agriculture. There is a large airfield with a tower and terminal at Abdelhafid Boussouf.

The Institute of National Studies of Tiaret holds 25,000 volumes in its library.

Politics
The province suffered massacres (the largest being the Sid El-Antri massacre in 1997), killings, and bombings during the Algerian Civil War, though less so than areas closer to Algiers. The Africa Institute reported in a May 2004 monograph that Tiaret's more "arid and mountainous landscape has facilitated terrorist activities". The MIPT Terrorism Knowledge Base reports that Tiaret "is a frequent site of attacks by the Salafist Group for Call and Combat (GSPC)" (now known as Al-Qaeda in the Islamic Maghreb). The GSPC is "believed to have close ties to Osama bin Laden" (Paris AFX News Agency, Jul 13, 2005) and Abu Musab al-Zarqawi (Asharq Alaswat Jul 3 2005), and is reported to be active in Italy (Deutsche Welle, Jul 15 2005).

History
The province has been inhabited since antiquity, and there are numerous megalithic monuments. It served as a Roman station and fort, Tingartia. Near Tiaret are the jedars, which are ancient mausoleums. The edifices demonstrate that the area was inhabited during the Late Antiquity by a Berber tribe(s) that could build in stone.

Tiaret grew up as a site under the domination of small Berber tribal kingdoms; the first of these being the Rustamid dynasty between 761 and 909 when Tiaret served as the capital of the area.  However, this capital may have been 10 km (6 or 7 miles) west of the present-day Tiaret. It was first founded by Abd al-Rahman Rustamid, an Ibadi theologian from Greater Iran. Tiaret was said to be relatively free-thinking and democratic, being a centre for scholarship that permitted a wide range of sects and movements, notably the Mu'tazila. There were many Jews living in the area until at least the 10th century, including the scholar and doctor Judah ibn Kuraish who became the doctor to the Emir of Fes. Tiaret was captured by the Fatimids in 909.

Later, from the start of the 8th century, it was the key northern terminus of the West African branch of the slave trade. As such, it offered a lucrative income from taxes on the trade, and was a desirable prize.

The Rustamid empire, which during the reign of Abdurrahman (766–784) and his son Abdul Wahab (784–823) extended over the greater part of the modern Algeria, was known as the Ibadite Empire from Abdallah ibn Ibad, the founder of the sect to which Abdurrahman belonged. Seven princes of the Rustamite house succeeded Abdul Wahab until they were overthrown by the Fatimite general Abu Abdallah al-Shi'i in 909.

From the year 911 Tiaret was fought over by a number of tribes, being first captured by Massala ibn Habbus of the Miknasas in the year 911, in alliance with the Fatimid Caliphate. Finally, in 933, it was in the hands of the Fatimids. After 933 Tiaret ceased to be the capital of a separate state. Most of the population was banished to Ouargla and then escaped to the inhospitable M'zab. From 933 Tiaret attracted many Khawarij Muslim settlers from Iraq.

From 933 it was administered as part of the Kingdom of Tlemcen, and in the 16th century fell to the Ottoman Empire. In 1843 it fell to the French after they defeated Emir Abdelkader El Djezairi.

The modern town of Tiaret is built around a French redoubt of 1845.  The new town attracted many settlers from France and the area flourished. A  narrow gauge railway arrived in 1889, connecting the town to Mostaganem - today, this rail line is defunct.

Archeological attractions

Thirty kilometres (18 miles) S.S.W. of Tiaret are the sepulchral monuments known as the Jedars. The name is given to a number of sepulchral monuments placed on hill-tops. A rectangular or square podium is in each case surmounted by a pyramid. The tombs date from the 5th to the 7th century, and lie in two distinct groups between Tiaret and Frenda.

At Mechra-Sfa ("ford of the flat stones"), a peninsula in the valley of the river Mina not far from Tiaret, are said to be "vast numbers" of megalithic monuments.

Climate
In Tiaret, there is a Mediterranean climate. In winter there is more rainfall than in summer. The Köppen-Geiger climate classification is Csa. About  of precipitation falls annually.

Notes

Further reading
 Bourouiba, Rachid (1982). Cités disparus: Tahert, Sedrata, Achir, Kalaâ des Béni-Hammad. Collection Art et Culture, 14. Algiers Ministère de l'information. (About notable cultural artifacts and architecture).
 Belkhodja, A. (1998). Tiaret, memoire d'une ville. Tiaret, A. Belkhodja. (A personal memoir).
 Blanchard, Raoul. (1992). Amenagement & Gestion Du Territoire, Ou, L'apport Des Images-Satellite, De La Geoinfographique Et Du Terrain : Applications Aux Paysages Vegetaux De L'Algerie Steppique & Substeppique (Wilaya De Tiaret) Et Aux Espaces Construits (Tiaret Et Alger) 1990-1992. Laboratoire d'analyse spatiale. Nice, France. (Plant ecology of the Wilaya De Tiaret region, evidenced using photos from space).
 Cadenat, Pierre. (1938). Indication de quelques stations préhistoriques de la région de Tiaret Société de géographie et d'archéologie de la Province d'Oran. Extrait de son Bulletin, tome 59, fascicule 209, 1938.  (12 pages booklet about the prehistoric monuments in the region).

External links
 Tiaret seen from the air
 Tiaret city plan
 Old photos and postcards of French Tiaret.

Communes of Tiaret Province
Province seats of Algeria